September 16 - Eastern Orthodox liturgical calendar - September 18

All fixed commemorations below celebrated on September 30 by Eastern Orthodox Churches on the Old Calendar.

For September 17th, Orthodox Churches on the Old Calendar commemorate the Saints listed on September 4.

Saints
 Hieromartyrs Heraclides and Myron, Bishops of Tamassos in Cyprus (1st century)
 Martyrs Sophia and her three daughters Faith (Vera), Hope (Nadezhda), and Love (Lyubov), at Rome (c. 137)
 Martyr Agathocleia (230) 
 Martyr Theodota of Cappadocia, at Nicaea (230)
 Martyrs Lucy and her son Geminian of Rome (303) 
 156 Martyrs of Palestine, including (310):
 Peleus and Nilus, Bishops of Egypt;
 Zeno, Priest;
 Patermuthius and Elias, noblemen, by fire.
 Martyrs Maximus, Theodotus and Asclepiodotus, of Marcianopolis in Thrace.  (see also: September 15)
 Saints Charalampus and Pantelon, and companions.

Pre-Schism Western saints
 Saint Flocellus, a youth martyred in Autun in France under the Emperor Marcus Aurelius (161-180)
 Saint Justin the Confessor, a priest in Rome who devoted himself to burying the bodies of martyrs and was eventually martyred himself (259)
 Saints Narcissus and Crescendo, early martyrs in Rome (c. 260)
 Saints Socrates and Stephen, by tradition early martyrs venerated in Britain, now England.
 Saint Theodora, a noble lady of Rome devoted to the service of the martyrs during the persecution of Diocletian (c. 305)
 Saint Satyrus of Milan, elder brother of St Ambrose of Milan in Italy (376)
 Saint Rodingus (Rouin), a monk and priest from Ireland who preached in Germany and entered the monastery of Tholey near Trier (c. 690)
 Hieromartyr Lambert of Maastricht, Bishop of Maastricht (704)
 Saint Columba, a nun at Tábanos, martyred in Cordoba in Spain for rejecting Islam (853)
 Saint Unni (Uni, Unno, Huno), a monk at New Corvey in Germany, who became Bishop of Bremen-Hamburg in 917 (936)

Post-Schism Orthodox saints
 Saint Euxiphius of Cyprus, monk (12th century)
 Venerable Anastasius of Perioteron, in Cyprus, Wonderworker (12th century) 
 Saint Joachim I, Patriarch of Alexandria (1567)
 Saint Innocent, Archimandrite, of Glinsk Hermitage (1888)
 Saint Dionisie Erhan of Ismail and Cetatea Alba (1934-1943), in the Metropolis of Bessarabia (1943)

New martyrs and confessors
 New Hieromartyrs of the St. Nicholas Koryazha Monastery, Arkhangelsk (1918):
 Paul (Moiseyev) and Theodosius (Sobolev), Archimandrites;
 Nicodemus (Shchapkov) and Seraphim (Kulakov), Hieromonks.
 Virgin-martyr Irene Frolov (1931)
 Martyr John Korotkov (1941)
 Virgin-martyr Alexandra Hvorostyannikova (1943)

Other commemorations
 Icon of the Mother of God of Constantinople ("Tsaregrad") (1071)
 Icon of the Mother of God of Macariev ("Directress") (1442)
 Repose of Blessed Agapitus (1825), disciple of St. Tikhon of Zadonsk.
 Repose of lay recluse Matthew of St. Petersburg (1904)

Icon gallery

Notes

References

Sources
 September 17/September 30. Orthodox Calendar (PRAVOSLAVIE.RU).
 September 30 / September 17. HOLY TRINITY RUSSIAN ORTHODOX CHURCH (A parish of the Patriarchate of Moscow).
 September 17. OCA - The Lives of the Saints.
 The Autonomous Orthodox Metropolia of Western Europe and the Americas (ROCOR). St. Hilarion Calendar of Saints for the year of our Lord 2004. St. Hilarion Press (Austin, TX). p. 69.
 The Seventeenth Day of the Month of September. Orthodoxy in China.
 September 17. Latin Saints of the Orthodox Patriarchate of Rome.
 The Roman Martyrology. Transl. by the Archbishop of Baltimore. Last Edition, According to the Copy Printed at Rome in 1914. Revised Edition, with the Imprimatur of His Eminence Cardinal Gibbons. Baltimore: John Murphy Company, 1916. pp. 286–288.
 Rev. Richard Stanton. A Menology of England and Wales, or, Brief Memorials of the Ancient British and English Saints Arranged According to the Calendar, Together with the Martyrs of the 16th and 17th Centuries. London: Burns & Oates, 1892. p. 451.

 Greek Sources
 Great Synaxaristes:  17 ΣΕΠΤΕΜΒΡΙΟΥ. ΜΕΓΑΣ ΣΥΝΑΞΑΡΙΣΤΗΣ.
  Συναξαριστής. 17 Σεπτεμβρίου. ECCLESIA.GR. (H ΕΚΚΛΗΣΙΑ ΤΗΣ ΕΛΛΑΔΟΣ).
  17/09/. Ορθόδοξος Συναξαριστής.

 Russian Sources
  30 сентября (17 сентября). Православная Энциклопедия под редакцией Патриарха Московского и всея Руси Кирилла (электронная версия). (Orthodox Encyclopedia - Pravenc.ru).
  17 сентября по старому стилю / 30 сентября по новому стилю. Русская Православная Церковь - Православный церковный календарь на  год.

September in the Eastern Orthodox calendar